Sir John Rodney Johnson, KCMG, FRGS (6 September 1930 – 15 October 2018) was a British colonial administrator, diplomat, and academic administrator.

After serving in the Colonial Service in Kenya, Johnson joined the Foreign Service, becoming British High Commissioner to Zambia and to Kenya. After his retirement, he served as Director of the University of Oxford's Foreign Service Programme. He was also chairman of the Countryside Commission.

References 

1930 births
2018 deaths
People educated at Manchester Grammar School
Alumni of Keble College, Oxford
Members of HM Diplomatic Service
Colonial Service officers
Knights Commander of the Order of St Michael and St George
High Commissioners of the United Kingdom to Kenya
High Commissioners of the United Kingdom to Zambia
Fellows of the Royal Geographical Society
British academic administrators